Bernhard Weiß may refer to:

 Bernhard Weiß (police executive) (1880–1951), German lawyer and Vice President of the Berlin police during the Weimar Republic
 Bernhard Weiss (1827–1918), New Testament scholar
 Bernhard Weiß (musician), vocalist with Axxis